The 2011 season is the 37th season of competitive football in Seychelles.

National teams 

The home team or the team that is designated as the home team is listed in the left column; the away team is in the right column.

Senior

Friendly matches

2011 Indian Ocean Island Games

2014 FIFA World Cup qualification

Seychelles First Division

Seychellois clubs in international competitions

St Michel United FC

References
 Fifa - Seychelles Association
 Seychelles tables at Soccerway
 Seychelles national team at Soccerway

Seychelles
Seasons in Seychellois football
2011 in Seychelles